The 1975 Cal Poly Pomona Broncos football team represented the University of California, Riverside as a member of the California Collegiate Athletic Association (CCAA) during the 1975 NCAA Division II football season. Led by second-year head coach Bob Toledo, UC Riverside compiled an overall record of 7–3 with a mark of 4–0 in conference play, winning the CCAA title. The team outscored its opponents 278 to 192 for the season. The Highlanders played home games Highlander Stadium in Riverside, California.

Despite winning the conference championship for the second consecutive year and for the third time in four seasons, UC Riverside announced, on December 4, 1975, that they were discontinuing their football program. They primary reason given was lack of fan support attendance. The Highlanders played for 21 seasons (1955–1975).

Schedule

Team players in the NFL
The following 1975 UC Riverside players were selected in the 1976 NFL Draft or later. Dan Bunz and Calvin Sweeney transferred to other colleges as a result of the disbanding of the UC Riverside football program then were drafted out of that new school.

References

UC Riverside
UC Riverside Highlanders football seasons
California Collegiate Athletic Association football champion seasons
UC Riverside Highlanders football